9X Tashan is a Punjabi language music channel operated by 9X Media. Channel was launched on 31 August 2011 and is now available on major DTH and cable operators across India including Asianet Digital TV, Airtel digital TV, Tata Sky, Sun Direct, Reliance Digital TV, Dish TV and Videocon d2h.

See also
 9XM
 9x Jhakaas

References

External links
 9X Tashan Official Website

9X Media
Punjabi-language television channels in India

Music television channels in India